PG College Ghazipur is a postgraduate college situated in Ghazipur, Uttar Pradesh, India. The college was established in July 1957 as the first Degree College of Ghazipur. Initially it was affiliated with University of Gorakhpur but currently its affiliation is with VBS Purvanchal University, Jaunpur. Currently it offers courses in four main streams: arts, science, agriculture, Commerce and education.

Location 
The college is situated on the western edge of Ghazipur. Near the college is the famous archeological site tomb of Lord Cornwallis. The college has some large farms in its surroundings which are owned by the college's agricultural department. Its campus has a mango grove and a garden which has many varieties of Gulab flower.

History 
The college was founded as a degree college in affiliation with Gorakhpur University in 1957. Before becoming a college, it was a secondary school run by Theosophical Society Affiliates.

Courses 
Courses are offered in the arts (both bachelors (B.A.) and masters (M.A.)), sciences (B.Sc. and M.Sc.), agriculture (B.Sc.Ag.and M.Sc.Ag) and education (B.Ed.). Commerce( B.com and M.Com. ) The college has a new wing which is offering technical and professional courses (BCA, MCA, BBA and MBA), which are currently being run as a separate institution named TERIPGC. Degrees are offered from PTU.

Alumni 
Mukhtar Ansari

External links 
Official Website of college- Post Graduate College, Ghazipur

References 

Postgraduate colleges in Uttar Pradesh
Science colleges in India
Arts colleges in India
Colleges of education in India
Commerce colleges in India
Agricultural universities and colleges in Uttar Pradesh
Education in Ghazipur district
Ghazipur
Educational institutions established in 1957
1957 establishments in Uttar Pradesh